Lenney is a surname. Notable people with the surname include:

Dinah Lenney (born 1956), American actress and writer
Ralph Lenney (1895–1971), English footballer
Will Lenney (born 1996), English YouTuber

See also
Lenny (given name)
Linney